The election to the 2017 Pune Municipal Corporation was held from 27 January to 23 February 2017. This election saw a voter turnout of 55.52% election. On 15 March 2017, BJP's Mukta Tilak and RPI(A)' s Navnath Kamble of the and were respectively elected as the mayor and deputy mayor

Background 

As many as 1,090 candidates were in the fray for the 162 seats of 2017 PMC election which has with a total electorate of about 26.34 lakh.

Schedule 

Pune Municipal Corporation 2017 Election Program was 27 January to 23 February 2017.

Election results

The results of the election were counted and declared on 23 February 2017.

Results by Ward Wise 

The election results for all 162 seats were declared on 23 February 2017

References

Pune
Pune Municipal Corporation
Pune